The Mansfield railway line is a closed  branch railway line situated in the Hume region of Victoria, Australia. The line was primarily built to provide a general goods and passenger service to townships in the area.

History
The line was opened in 6 stages from November 1883 to October 1891, and closed in November 1978.

The line was a result of a decade of local lobbying, and provided improved access for agricultural products from the region to Melbourne markets.

The last regular passenger service operated to Mansfield on 28 May 1977 by 280hp Walker railmotor 91 RM. It was replaced by a bus service via , but was rerouted via  after road upgrades were carried out. By this point the track had deteriorated beyond Yea, and after March 1977 the majority of services beyond this point were buses.

The line was closed on 8 November 1978 along with the branch line to Alexandra. The line was quickly dismantled following closure, preventing any chance of tourist services from operating along the line despite some interest being shown. Many bridges along the line were also removed with only the uprights remaining. The trackbed has since been re-used for a 134 kilometre bike trail, the Great Victorian Rail Trail. The trail was funded by the Federal Government and local councils.

Stations

References

External links
 Photographs of stations along the Mansfield line
 Goulburn River High Country Rail Trail

Closed regional railway lines in Victoria (Australia)
5 ft 3 in gauge railways in Australia
Railway lines opened in 1883
Railway lines closed in 1978
1883 establishments in Australia
1978 disestablishments in Australia
Transport in Hume (region)